Sir Amias Paulet (1532 – 26 September 1588) of Hinton St. George, Somerset, was an English diplomat, Governor of Jersey, and the gaoler for a period of Mary, Queen of Scots.

Origins
He was the son of Sir Hugh Paulet of Hinton St George by his wife Philippa Pollard, a daughter of Sir Lewis Pollard (c.1465 – 21 October 1526), Justice of the Common Pleas, of King's Nympton, Devon.

Career
Paulet went to Jersey in 1550 when his father was made Governor and immediately acted as his assistant. The following year he was sent by his father to complain to the Privy Council that officials in Normandy were refusing to hand over six thieves who had escaped from Jersey. He was sent to Paris with a letter for the Constable of France, and thence to Normandy, returning ultimately to Jersey with his prisoners.

In 1556 he was formally appointed Lieutenant-Governor and by the end of the decade he was effectively running the island in his father's absence. He kept this post until 1573. His father Hugh died that year, and Paulet was made Governor, a post he held until his death. There was much concern at this time about invasion by the French and Paulet went on a spying mission to the Brittany coast to discover for himself whether ships and troops were being gathered. Nothing happened because the death of the French king brought a temporary cessation to threats against the Channel Islands. However, relations with nearby Normandy were not good, as shown by a letter from Amias to his father:
Mr St Aubin has been arrested by Mons Boisrougier of Coutances, and after fourteen days imprisonment dismissed with the loss of a goshawk and 20 ells of canvas. I wrote to this Monsieur for redress, but he answered he was sorry he had dismissed his prisoner, and that his stock was not better, advising me to look to myself, as he hoped to pluck me out of my house, as he had the Captain of Alderney. If I had the Queen's leave, I would ask no aid but the retinue of this Castle to pluck him out of his house.

Amias continued his father's work on strengthening Mont Orguiel Castle, despite the lack of funds available from Elizabeth. He wrote in 1557:
"Though I have husbanded Her Majesty's money well I have been constrained to employ more than I received, and our walls want a third part yet".
And in 1563:
"I am much deceived, considering the depth of the foundation, the height and thickness of the walls, if a greater piece of work hath ever been done for the like sum".
And again in 1573:
"A strong piece of work, begun four or five years ago, lacks completion of one third. Four hundred pounds will be needed this year and four hundred next."

Like his father, Amias was strongly anti-Catholic, although more Calvinist than Protestant. When the first Huguenot refugees poured into Jersey in 1558 he appointed some of the priests among them as Rectors and ignored his father's wishes, and to an extent those of Queen Elizabeth, over which prayer book should be used in island churches. His appointment to the Town Church of Guillaume Morise, a Huguenot minister from Anjou, led to the establishment of what Chroniques de Jersey described as the first "real Reformed Church in Jersey".

There was a second influx of Huguenots in 1568 and they, too, were welcomed by Amias, although his father had reservations and wrote:
"I approve my son's zeal in receiving these strangers, but I cannot like their continued abode in the isle. They should be passed on." But father and son got on well, despite these occasional disagreements, and in 1571 Amias was made joint-Governor, becoming sole Governor on his father's death, probably in 1578, although there are no records of the transition.

In 1576 Queen Elizabeth raised him to knighthood, appointed him Ambassador to Paris and at the same time put the young Francis Bacon under his charge. Paulet was in this embassy until he was recalled November 1579.  In 1579, he took into his household, the young Jean Hotman, son of Francis Hotman, to tutor his two sons Anthony and George. When the family returned to England, the tutor and his two charges settled at Oxford.

His duties increasingly meant that Amias was absent from the island for long periods. He was appointed resident Ambassador in France for three years in 1576 and appointed Guillaume Lempriere, Seigneur of Trinity, his Lieutenant-Governor. He was clearly well trusted, because Queen Elizabeth's principal secretary Sir Francis Walsingham wrote:
"Her Majesty wishes you in matters that concern her service to deal as you think fit, though you have no special direction, such trust she reposes in you."
He was present in Jersey in 1583 for the swearing-in of his son Anthony as Lieutenant-Governor and his brother George as Bailiff, before leaving to join the Privy Council.

A fanatical Puritan with a harsh character, Paulet was appointed gaoler of Mary, Queen of Scots, by Elizabeth in January 1585, at Chartley Castle, and guarded her very strictly. He replaced the more tolerant Sir Ralph Sadler who had given Mary far more liberty. He remained her keeper until Mary's execution at Fotheringhay Castle on 8 February 1587. After Mary's conviction, Walsingham wrote to Paulet requesting he assassinate Mary, to spare Elizabeth from involvement in her death. In a letter to Walsingham, Paulet refused to "make so great a shipwreck of my conscience, or leave so great a blot to my poor posterity, as shed blood without law or warrant". He was the appointed Chancellor of the Order of the Garter.

Marriage and progeny
He married Margaret Harvey, a daughter of Antony Harvey, of Columbjohn in Devon, an "expert surveyor", by whom he had three sons and three daughters:
 Hugh Paulet (b. 1558), the eldest son, who predeceased his father.
 Anthony Paulet (b. 1562), eldest surviving son and heir, who also succeeded his father as Governor of Jersey. His son was John Poulett, 1st Baron Poulett (born c. 1585).
 George Paulet (b. 1565), who married his distant cousin Elizabeth Paulet, daughter and heiress of Edward Paulet of Goathurst, in Somerset
 Joan Paulet, wife of Robert Haydon (1560–1626) of Bowood, Epford and Cadhay House in Devonshire.
 Sarah Paulet, second wife of Sir Francis Vincent, 1st Baronet (c. 1568 – 1640) of Stoke d'Abernon, in Surrey. Sir Francis Vincent's third wife was Eleanor Mallet (1573–1645), the widow and step-first cousin of Sir Arthur Acland (died 1610) of Acland in the parish of Landkey, and of Columbjohn in the parish of Broadclyst, Devon.
 Elizabeth Paulet, died unmarried.

Death and burial
Paulet died in London on 26 September 1588 and was buried in the church of St Martin-in-the-Fields. However, his remains and monument were later removed to the Church of St George, Hinton St George, after the original church was rebuilt. His name (as "Amyas le Poulet") was used by Mark Twain for a character in A Connecticut Yankee in King Arthur's Court.

Works

See also
 Elizabeth R
 Elizabeth: The Golden Age

References

Sources
 Jersey Through the Centuries: A Chronology, Leslie Sinel, Jersey, (1984)
 Mary, Queen of Scots, Antonia Fraser, (1971), Dell Publishing Company, Inc., New York
 Letter books of Amias Paulet, Morris, John, ed., (1874)
 Copy-book of Sir Amias Poulet's letters, written during his embassy to France, Ogle, Octavius, ed., (1866), Roxburghe Club

External links

 His portrait at the National Portrait Gallery

16th-century English diplomats
Knights Bachelor
Ambassadors of England to France
Governors of Jersey
People from Somerset
1532 births
1588 deaths
Amias
Chancellors of the Order of the Garter
Burials at the Poulett mausoleum, Church of St George (Hinton St George)